Kim Kyong-ju (born 19 January 1983) is a North Korean diver. She competed in the women's 10 metre platform event at the 2004 Summer Olympics.

References

External links
 

1983 births
Living people
North Korean female divers
Olympic divers of North Korea
Divers at the 2004 Summer Olympics
Place of birth missing (living people)
Asian Games medalists in diving
Divers at the 2002 Asian Games
Asian Games silver medalists for North Korea
Asian Games bronze medalists for North Korea
Medalists at the 2002 Asian Games
21st-century North Korean women